The Keg River Formation is a stratigraphic unit of Givetian age in the Western Canada Sedimentary Basin.

Description 
It takes the name from the Keg River, a tributary of the Peace River, and was first described in the California Standard Steen River 2-22-117-5W6M well (situated north of Zama Lake) by J. Law in 1955.

Lithology 
The Keg River Formation is composed of dark dolomite with intercrystalline or vuggy porosity and wackestone limestone. 

The Rainbow Member and upper Keg River Member are reef formations deposited in the Rainbow, Zama and Bitscho sub-basins.

Distribution 
The Keg River Formation occurs in the subsurface from northeastern to northwestern Alberta and its southern border is defined by the Peace River Arch.

Relationship to other units 
The Keg River Formation is conformably overlain by the Muskeg Formation and unconformably overlays the Chinchaga Formation.

It is equivalent to the Pine Point Formation, Hume Formation and Nahanni Formation in north-eastern British Columbia and the Northwest Territories and to the Winnipegosis Formation in Saskatchewan and eastern Alberta.

Economic geology

Petroleum geology 
Oil is produced from the Keg River reefs in the Zama Lake and Rainbow Lake areas of north-western Alberta.

References 

Stratigraphy of Alberta
Stratigraphy of British Columbia
Stratigraphy of the Northwest Territories
Devonian southern paleotropical deposits
Givetian Stage